The Red Tai (in Vietnamese language Thái Đỏ; in Lao language Tai Daeng) are an ethnic group of Vietnam and Laos. They speak the Tai Daeng language. In Vietnam, they are called Thái Đỏ and are included in the group of the Thái people, together with the Thái Đen ("Black Tai"), Thái Trắng ("White Tai"), Phu Thai, Tày Thanh and Thái Hàng Tổng. The group of the Thái people is the third largest of the fifty-four ethnic groups recognized by the Vietnamese government.

Geographic distribution
140,000 in Vietnam (2002)
25,000 in Laos (1991)
Unknown population in Thailand
Unknown population in the United States

Population clusters
Thanh Hóa Province of Vietnam

Family
Patriarchal

Religions
Animism/Theravada Buddhism (95.5%)
Christian (4.5%)

References

Ethnic groups in Vietnam
Ethnic groups in Thailand
Ethnic groups in Laos
Tai peoples